The 2022–23 Los Angeles Lakers season is the 76th season of the franchise, its 75th season in the National Basketball Association (NBA), its 63rd season in Los Angeles, and its 24th season playing home games at Crypto.com Arena. On April 11, 2022, the Los Angeles Lakers fired Frank Vogel as head coach. On June 3, 2022, the Lakers hired Darvin Ham as their new head coach.

The Lakers began the season 0–5 and were the last winless team in the league. It was the first time that LeBron James started a season 0–5 since his rookie season with the Cleveland Cavaliers in 2003. The Lakers earned their first win in the following game against the Denver Nuggets, after Anthony Davis returned from a one-game absence due to lower back tightness. He scored 23 points and had 15 rebounds, and James added 26 points. In his second game off the bench as the Lakers' sixth man, Russell Westbrook had 18 points, eight rebounds, and eight assists. After winning their next game against the New Orleans Pelicans, the Lakers lost 130–116 to the Utah Jazz, failing to secure their first three-game winning streak since January 7, 2022.

On November 18, 2022, the Lakers won their second straight game for the second time this season and they also won their third straight game for the first time since January 2022. The Lakers retired No. 99 in honor of George Mikan on October 30, 2022. Pau Gasol's No. 16 was retired on March 7, 2023, against his former team the Memphis Grizzlies. On 7 February, 2023, James broke the NBA scoring record against the Oklahoma City Thunder.

Draft

The Lakers did not hold any pick in the 2022 NBA draft. However, they got the 35th pick, Max Christie, in a trade with the Orlando Magic in exchange for a 2028 second-round pick and cash considerations.

Standings

Division

Conference

Roster

Game log

Preseason

|-style="background:#fcc;
| 1
| October 3
| Sacramento
| 
| Anthony Davis (11)
| Anthony Davis (11)
| Westbrook,  Christie (3)
| Crypto.com Arena17,919
| 0–1
|-style="background:#fcc;
| 2
| October 5
| Phoenix
| 
| LeBron James (23)
| Austin Reaves (7)
| Austin Reaves (9)
| T-Mobile Arena8,908
| 0–2
|-style="background:#fcc;
| 3
| October 6
| @ Minnesota
| 
| Thomas Bryant (18)
| Austin Reaves (8)
| Scotty Pippen Jr. (7)
| T-Mobile Arena7,311
| 0–3
|-style="background:#cfc;
| 4
| October 9
| @ Golden State
| 
| Anthony Davis (28)
| Cole Swider (6)
| Kendrick Nunn (7)
| Chase Center18,064
| 1–3
|-style="background:#fcc;
| 5
| October 12
| Minnesota
| 
| LeBron James (25)
| Anthony Davis (13)
| Beverley, Reaves (5)
| Crypto.com Arena18,754
| 1–4
|-style="background:#fcc;
| 6
| October 14
| @ Sacramento
| 
| James, Reaves (10)
| LeBron James (5)
| Reaves, Pippen Jr. (3)
| Golden 1 Center17,611
| 1–5

Regular season

|-style="background:#fcc"
| 1
| October 18
| @ Golden State
| 
| LeBron James (31)
| LeBron James (14)
| LeBron James (8)
| Chase Center18,064
| 0–1
| TNT
|-style="background:#fcc"
| 2
| October 20
| L.A. Clippers
| 
| Lonnie Walker IV (26)
| LeBron James (10)
| LeBron James (6)
| Crypto.com Arena (LAL)18,997
| 0–2
| TNT
|-style="background:#fcc"
| 3
| October 23
| Portland
| 
| LeBron James (31)
| Anthony Davis (10)
| LeBron James (8)
| Crypto.com Arena18,997
| 0–3
| Spectrum SportsNet
|-style="background:#fcc"
| 4
| October 26
| @ Denver
| 
| Anthony Davis (22)
| Anthony Davis (14)
| LeBron James (9)
| Ball Arena19,520
| 0–4
| ESPN
|-style="background:#fcc"
| 5
| October 28
| @ Minnesota
| 
| LeBron James (28)
| Brown Jr., Jones, Westbrook (8)
| LeBron James (5)
| Target Center17,136
| 0–5
| Bally Sports North
|-style="background:#cfc"
| 6
| October 30
| Denver
| 
| LeBron James (26)
| Anthony Davis (15)
| James, Westbrook (8)
| Crypto.com Arena18,997
| 1–5
| Spectrum SportsNet

|-style="background:#cfc"
| 7
| November 2
| New Orleans
| 
| Lonnie Walker IV (28)
| Anthony Davis (15)
| Russell Westbrook (9)
| Crypto.com Arena18,997
| 2–5
| Spectrum SportsNet
|-style="background:#fcc"
| 8
| November 4
| Utah
| 
| Russell Westbrook (26)
| LeBron James (10)
| LeBron James (8)
| Crypto.com Arena18,997
| 2–6
| Spectrum SportsNet
|-style="background:#fcc"
| 9
| November 6
| Cleveland
| 
| LeBron James (27)
| Anthony Davis (12)
| Russell Westbrook (12)
| Crypto.com Arena18,997
| 2–7
| Spectrum SportsNet
|-style="background:#fcc"
| 10
| November 7
| @ Utah
| 
| Anthony Davis (29)
| Damian Jones (7)
| Russell Westbrook (5)
| Vivint Arena18,206
| 2–8
| Spectrum SportsNet
|-style="background:#fcc"
| 11
| November 9
| @ L.A. Clippers
| 
| LeBron James (30)
| James, Reaves (9)
| Russell Westbrook (9)
| Crypto.com Arena (LAC)19,068
| 2–9
| ESPN
|-style="background:#fcc"
| 12
| November 11
| Sacramento
| 
| Anthony Davis (24)
| Anthony Davis (14)
| Russell Westbrook (11)
| Crypto.com Arena17,849
| 2–10
| Spectrum SportsNet
|-style="background:#cfc"
| 13
| November 13
| Brooklyn
| 
| Anthony Davis (37)
| Anthony Davis (18)
| Russell Westbrook (12)
| Crypto.com Arena18,040
| 3–10
| Spectrum SportsNet
|-style="background:#cfc"
| 14
| November 18
| Detroit
| 
| Anthony Davis (38)
| Anthony Davis (16)
| Russell Westbrook (12)
| Crypto.com Arena18,095
| 4–10
| Spectrum SportsNet
|-style="background:#cfc"
| 15
| November 20
| San Antonio
| 
| Anthony Davis (30)
| Anthony Davis (18)
| Russell Westbrook (10)
| Crypto.com Arena18,211
| 5–10
| Spectrum SportsNet
|-style="background:#fcc"
| 16
| November 22
| @ Phoenix
| 
| Anthony Davis (37)
| Anthony Davis (21)
| Russell Westbrook (5)
| Footprint Center17,071
| 5–11
| TNT
|-style="background:#cfc"
| 17
| November 25
| @ San Antonio
| 
| Anthony Davis (25)
| Anthony Davis (15)
| Russell Westbrook (7)
| AT&T Center18,354
| 6–11
| Bally Sports Southwest
|-style="background:#cfc 
| 18
| November 26
| @ San Antonio
| 
| LeBron James (39) 
| LeBron James (11)
| Schröder, Westbrook (6)
| AT&T Center18,354
| 7–11
| Bally Sports Southwest
|-style="background:#fcc"
| 19
| November 28
| Indiana
| 
| Anthony Davis (25)
| Anthony Davis (13)
| Davis, Westbrook (6)
| Crypto.com Arena16,034
| 7–12
| Spectrum SportsNet
|-style="background:#cfc"
| 20
| November 30
| Portland
| 
| LeBron James (31)
| Anthony Davis (12)
| LeBron James (8)
| Crypto.com Arena18,560
| 8–12
| NBA TV

|-style="background:#cfc"
| 21
| December 2
| @ Milwaukee
| 
| Anthony Davis (44)
| Anthony Davis (10)
| James, Westbrook (11)
| Fiserv Forum17,938
| 9–12
|-style="background:#cfc"
| 22
| December 4
| @ Washington
| 
| Anthony Davis (55)
| Anthony Davis (17)
| Russell Westbrook (15)
| Capital One Arena19,647
| 10–12
|-style="background:#fcc"
| 23
| December 6
| @ Cleveland
| 
| LeBron James (21)
| LeBron James (17)
| LeBron James (4)
| Rocket Mortgage FieldHouse19,432
| 10–13
|-style="background:#fcc"
| 24
| December 7
| @ Toronto
| 
| Dennis Schröder (18)
| Damian Jones (10)
| Russell Westbrook (4)
| Scotiabank Arena19,800
| 10–14
|-style="background:#fcc"
| 25
| December 9
| @ Philadelphia
| 
| Anthony Davis (31)
| Anthony Davis (12)
| Russell Westbrook (11)
| Wells Fargo Center20,852
| 10–15
|-style="background:#cfc"
| 26
| December 11
| @ Detroit
| 
| LeBron James (35)
| Anthony Davis (15)
| Russell Westbrook (9)
| Little Caesars Arena20,190
| 11–15
|-style="background:#fcc"
| 27
| December 13
| Boston
| 
| Anthony Davis (37)
| Russell Westbrook (14)
| LeBron James (9)
| Crypto.com Arena18,661
| 11–16
|-style="background:#cfc"
| 28
| December 16
| Denver
| 
| LeBron James (30)
| Russell Westbrook (11)
| Russell Westbrook (12)
| Crypto.com Arena18,505
| 12–16
|-style="background:#cfc"
| 29
| December 18
| Washington
| 
| LeBron James (33)
| Thomas Bryant (10)
| LeBron James (9)
| Crypto.com Arena18,153
| 13–16
|-style="background:#fcc"
| 30
| December 19
| @ Phoenix
| 
| Dennis Schröder (30)
| Damian Jones (7)
| Dennis Schröder (4)
| Footprint Center17,071
| 13–17
|-style="background:#fcc"
| 31
| December 21
| @ Sacramento
| 
| LeBron James (31)
| Thomas Bryant (10)
| LeBron James (11)
| Golden 1 Center17,611
| 13–18
|-style="background:#fcc"
| 32
| December 23
| Charlotte
| 
| LeBron James (34)
| Thomas Bryant (13)
| LeBron James (8)
| Crypto.com Arena18,997
| 13–19
|-style="background:#fcc"
| 33
| December 25
| @ Dallas
| 
| LeBron James (38)
| Wenyen Gabriel (7)
| LeBron James (5)
| American Airlines Center20,441
| 13–20
|-style="background:#cfc"
| 34
| December 27
| @ Orlando
| 
| LeBron James (28)
| Russell Westbrook (13)
| Russell Westbrook (13)
| Amway Center19,482
| 14–20
|-style="background:#fcc"
| 35
| December 28
| @ Miami
| 
| LeBron James (27)
| LeBron James (9)
| Russell Westbrook (8)
| FTX Arena20,221
| 14–21
|-style="background:#cfc"
| 36
| December 30
| @ Atlanta
| 
| LeBron James (47)
| Thomas Bryant (17)
| Russell Westbrook (11)
| State Farm Arena17,984
| 15–21

|-style="background:#cfc;"
| 37
| January 2
| @ Charlotte
| 
| LeBron James (43)
| Thomas Bryant (15)
| Austin Reaves (7)
| Spectrum Center19,210
| 16–21
|-style="background:#cfc"
| 38
| January 4
| Miami
| 
| Dennis Schröder (32) 
| Thomas Bryant (9)
| Russell Westbrook (9)
| Crypto.com Arena18,997
| 17–21
|-style="background:#cfc"
| 39
| January 6
| Atlanta
| 
| LeBron James (25)
| Thomas Bryant (13)
| LeBron James (10)
| Crypto.com Arena18,997
| 18–21
|-style="background:#cfc"
| 40
| January 7
| @ Sacramento
| 
| LeBron James (37)
| Thomas Bryant (14)
| Russell Westbrook (15)
| Golden 1 Center17,611
| 19–21
|-style="background:#fcc"
| 41
| January 9
| @ Denver
| 
| Russell Westbrook (25)
| Thomas Bryant (10)
| Russell Westbrook (7)
| Ball Arena19,609
| 19–22
|-style="background:#fcc"
| 42
| January 12
| Dallas
| 
| Russell Westbrook (28)
| LeBron James (16)
| LeBron James (9)
| Crypto.com Arena18,997
| 19–23
|-style="background:#fcc"
| 43
| January 15
| Philadelphia
| 
| LeBron James (35)
| Russell Westbrook (14)
| Russell Westbrook (11)
| Crypto.com Arena18,020
| 19–24
|-style="background:#cfc"
| 44
| January 16
| Houston
| 
| LeBron James (48)
| Wenyen Gabriel (9)
| LeBron James (9)
| Crypto.com Arena17,657
| 20–24
|-style="background:#fcc"
| 45
| January 18
| Sacramento
| 
| LeBron James (32)
| LeBron James (8)
| LeBron James (9)
| Crypto.com Arena18,142
| 20–25
|-style="background:#cfc"
| 46
| January 20
| Memphis
| 
| Russell Westbrook (29)
| LeBron James (9)
| Dennis Schröder (8)
| Crypto.com Arena18,997
| 21–25
|-style="background:#cfc"
| 47
| January 22
| @ Portland
| 
| LeBron James (37)
| Thomas Bryant (14)
| Dennis Schröder (8)
| Moda Center19,393
| 22–25
|-style="background:#fcc"
| 48
| January 24
| L.A. Clippers
| 
| LeBron James (46)
| LeBron James (8)
| LeBron James (7)
| Crypto.com Arena (LAL)18,997
| 22–26
|-style="background:#cfc"
| 49
| January 25
| San Antonio
| 
| Anthony Davis (21)
| Anthony Davis (12)
| LeBron James (11)
| Crypto.com Arena17,955
| 23–26
|-style="background:#fcc"
| 50
| January 28
| @ Boston
| 
| LeBron James (41)
| Anthony Davis (10)
| LeBron James (8)
| TD Garden19,156
| 23–27
|-style="background:#fcc"
| 51
| January 30
| @ Brooklyn
| 
| Thomas Bryant (18)
| Troy Brown Jr. (17)
| Russell Westbrook (10)
| Barclays Center17,924
| 23–28
|-style="background:#cfc"
| 52
| January 31
| @ New York
| 
| LeBron James (28)
| LeBron James (10)
| LeBron James (11)
| Madison Square Garden19,812
| 24–28

|-style="background:#cfc"
| 53
| February 2
| @ Indiana
| 
| Anthony Davis (31)
| Anthony Davis (14)
| Russell Westbrook (10)
| Gainbridge Fieldhouse17,274
| 25–28
|-style="background:#fcc"
| 54
| February 4
| @ New Orleans
| 
| Anthony Davis (34)
| Anthony Davis (14)
| Dennis Schröder (10)
| Smoothie King Center19,812
| 25–29
|-style="background:#fcc"
| 55
| February 7
| Oklahoma City
| 
| LeBron James (38)
| Anthony Davis (8)
| Russell Westbrook (8)
| Crypto.com Arena18,997
| 25–30
|-style="background:#fcc"
| 56
| February 9
| Milwaukee
| 
| Dennis Schröder (25)
| Anthony Davis (16)
| Dennis Schröder (12)
| Crypto.com Arena18,997
| 25–31
|-style="background:#cfc"
| 57
| February 11
| @ Golden State
| 
| Dennis Schröder (26)
| Anthony Davis (16)
| D'Angelo Russell (6)
| Chase Center18,064
| 26–31
|-style="background:#fcc"
| 58
| February 13
| @ Portland
| 
| Malik Beasley (22)
| Anthony Davis (20)
| Dennis Schröder (6)
| Moda Center18,299
| 26–32
|-style="background:#cfc"
| 59
| February 15
| New Orleans
| 
| Anthony Davis (28)
| Anthony Davis (10)
| D'Angelo Russell (7)
| Crypto.com Arena18,997
| 27–32
|-style="background:#cfc"
| 60
| February 23
| Golden State
| 
| Malik Beasley (25)
| Mo Bamba (13)
| LeBron James (8)
| Crypto.com Arena18,997
| 28–32
|-style="background:#cfc"
| 61
| February 26
| @ Dallas
| 
| Anthony Davis (30)
| Jarred Vanderbilt (17)
| Dennis Schröder (8)
| American Airlines Center20,411
| 29–32
|-style="background:#fcc;"
| 62
| February 28
| @ Memphis
| 
| Anthony Davis (28)
| Anthony Davis (19)
| Dennis Schröder (10)
| FedExForum17,794
| 29–33

|-style="background:#cfc"
| 63
| March 1
| @ Oklahoma City
| 
| Dennis Schröder (26)
| Wenyen Gabriel (10)
| Dennis Schröder (6)
| Paycom Center17,114
| 30–33
|-style="background:#fcc"
| 64
| March 3
| Minnesota
| 
| Anthony Davis (38)
| Malik Beasley (8)
| Dennis Schröder (12)
| Crypto.com Arena18,997
| 30–34
|-style="background:#cfc"
| 65
| March 5
| Golden State
| 
| Anthony Davis (39)
| Jarred Vanderbilt (13)
| Austin Reaves (8)
| Crypto.com Arena18,997
| 31–34
|-style="background:#cfc"
| 66
| March 7
| Memphis
| 
| Anthony Davis (30)
| Anthony Davis (22)
| Dennis Schröder (9)
| Crypto.com Arena18,997
| 32–34
|-style="background:#cfc"
| 67
| March 10
| Toronto
| 
| D'Angelo Russell (28)
| Anthony Davis (9)
| D'Angelo Russell (9)
| Crypto.com Arena18,322
| 33–34
|-style="background:#fcc"
| 68
| March 12
| New York
| 
| D'Angelo Russell (33)
| Anthony Davis (16)
| D'Angelo Russell (8)
| Crypto.com Arena18,997
| 33–35
|-style="background:#cfc"
| 69
| March 14
| @ New Orleans
| 
| Anthony Davis (35)
| Anthony Davis (17)
| Brown Jr., Reaves (5)
| Smoothie King Center18,625
| 34–35
|-style="background:#fcc"
| 70
| March 15
| @ Houston
| 
| Austin Reaves (24)
| Wenyen Gabriel (14)
| Reaves, Russell (7)
| Toyota Center18,055
| 34–36
|-style="background:#fcc"
| 71
| March 17
| Dallas
| 
| Anthony Davis (26)
| Wenyen Gabriel (11)
| D'Angelo Russell (11)
| Crypto.com Arena 18,997
| 34–37
|-style="background:#cfc"
| 72
| March 19
| Orlando
| 
| Austin Reaves (35)
| Anthony Davis (11)
| Reaves, Russell (6)
| Crypto.com Arena18,997
| 35–37
|-style="background:#"
| 73
| March 22
| Phoenix
| 
| 
| 
| 
| Crypto.com Arena
| 
|-style="background:#"
| 74
| March 24
| Oklahoma City
| 
| 
| 
| 
| Crypto.com Arena
| 
|-style="background:#"
| 75
| March 26
| Chicago
| 
| 
| 
| 
| Crypto.com Arena
| 
|-style="background:#"
| 76
| March 29
| @ Chicago
| 
| 
| 
| 
| United Center
| 
|-style="background:#"
| 77
| March 31
| @ Minnesota
| 
| 
| 
| 
| Target Center
| 

|-style="background:#"
| 78
| April 2
| @ Houston
| 
| 
| 
| 
| Toyota Center
| 
|-style="background:#"
| 79
| April 4
| @ Utah
| 
| 
| 
| 
| Vivint Arena
| 
|-style="background:#"
| 80
| April 5
| @ L.A. Clippers
| 
| 
| 
| 
| Crypto.com Arena (LAC)
| 
|-style="background:#"
| 81
| April 7
| Phoenix
| 
| 
| 
| 
| Crypto.com Arena
| 
|-style="background:#"
| 82
| April 9
| Utah
| 
| 
| 
| 
| Crypto.com Arena
|

Transactions

Trades

Free agency

Additions

Subtractions

Notes

References

External links
 2022–23 Los Angeles Lakers at Basketball-Reference.com

Los Angeles Lakers seasons
Los Angeles Lakers
Los Angeles Lakers
Los Angeles Lakers
Lakers
Lakers